South Granville is a suburb in western Sydney, in the state of New South Wales, Australia.

South Granville is an extension of Granville. They share the postcode of 2142 along with the separate suburbs of Camellia, Holroyd and Rosehill.

History 

Granville was named in 1880, after the British Colonial Secretary, the Granville Leveson-Gower, 2nd Earl Granville.

Parks and Sports Grounds

 Ray Marshall Reserve
 Horlyck Reserve and playground
 Harry Gapes Reserve
 Colquhoun Park
 Everley Park
 Melita Stadium

Education 
There are a number of schools around South Granville including Granville East Public School, Blaxcell Street Public School, and Holy Family Primary School, Granville South Creative and Performing Arts High School, and Granville South Public School

References

Suburbs of Sydney
City of Parramatta